Martika is the debut studio album by former child actor and teen pop singer Martika, released October 18, 1988 through CBS Records.

Background
The album marked the solo debut for Martika, and spawned the American #1 single "Toy Soldiers". The song is about drug addiction, but can sound like a break-up ballad. The song was later sampled by rapper Eminem for his 2004 song "Like Toy Soldiers" featuring Martika as the chorus singer. Songs that charted internationally included "More Than You Know", "Water", and "I Feel the Earth Move", a Carole King cover that cracked the American Top 25. Stylistically the music was strictly pop, despite exploring some adult topics lyrically. The song "Water" is partially sung in Spanish, a homage to Martika's Cuban ancestry. Other songs were re-recorded fully in Spanish for international release.

The album was successful in the United States; it managed to peak at #15 on the Billboard 200 and was certified Gold by the RIAA, making it her best-selling album to date. The album peaked at #11 in the United Kingdom, containing three top 20 singles there. In the UK, the song "Cross My Heart" had already been a top 20 hit for the band Eighth Wonder a year previously, whilst Big Fun pulled their planned single release of "I Feel the Earth Move" shortly before Martika's release.

Track listing
Side one
 "If You're Tarzan, I'm Jane" (Michael Jay, Greg Smith) – 4:20
 "Cross My Heart" (Jay) – 3:52
 "More Than You Know" (Martika, Jay, Marvin Morrow) – 4:10
 "Toy Soldiers" (Martika, Jay) – 4:51
 "You Got Me Into This" (Jay) – 4:11
Side two
<li>"I Feel the Earth Move" (Carole King) – 4:12
<li>"Water" (Martika, Sue Sheridan, Larry Treadwell) – 4:39
<li>"It's Not What You're Doing" (Roberts Etoll, Jay) – 4:13
<li>"See If I Care" (Martika, Jay, Morrow) – 3:41
<li>"Alibis" (Martika, Mitchell Kaplan) – 3:50

Alternative versions
Four of the tracks from the album were recorded in Spanish by Martika:
 "Como Un Juguete" ("Toy Soldiers") – 4:48
 "Siento Temblar La Tierra" ("I Feel the Earth Move")
 "Quiero Entregarte Mi Amor" ("More Than You Know") – 4:13
 "Agua" ("Water")

"Toy Soldiers" was also recorded by Martika in Japanese, released on an EP in 1989 called "Special Touch".

Personnel 

 Martika – lead vocals, backing vocals (2, 5, 8, 9, 10), shaker (10), arrangements (10), vocal arrangements 
 Greg Smith – keyboards (1, 4, 6), arrangements (1)
 Claude Gaudette – additional keyboards (1, 6), keyboards (2, 7), drum programming (2, 5, 7), arrangements (2, 5, 7)
 Brad Cole – additional keyboards (2), keyboards (3, 8), synth horns (5), arrangements (8)
 Marvin Morrow – keyboards (3, 9), drum programming (3), arrangements (9)
 Mitchell Kaplan – keyboards (10)
 Mark Leggett – guitars (1-5, 7, 8, 9)
 Don Kirkpatrick – guitars (6)
 David Macias – guitars (10)
 Marc Jones – bass (10)
 Michael Jay – drum programming (1, 2, 4, 5, 6, 8, 9), backing vocals (1), vocal arrangements (1-9), arrangements (1, 3, 4, 6, 8, 10)
 Christopher Ainsworth – drum programming (7)
 Omar Martinez – drums (10)
 Paulinho da Costa – percussion (5, 7, 9)
 Michael Mattioli – saxophone (10)
 Michael Cruz – backing vocals (1)
 Davey Faragher – backing vocals (1)
 Clif Magness – backing vocals (1)
 Rick Jude Palombi – backing vocals (1, 3, 6, 7)
 Donna De Lory – backing vocals (3, 6)
 Niki Haris – backing vocals (3)
 Stacy Ferguson – backing vocals (4)
 Marlen Landin – backing vocals (4)
 Kimberly McCullough – backing vocals (4)
 Rahsaan Patterson – backing vocals (4, 7, 10)
 Devyn Puett – backing vocals (4)
 Renee Sands – backing vocals (4)
 Alitzah Wiener – backing vocals (4)
 Mona Lisa Young – backing vocals (6)
 Laura Creamer – backing vocals (7)
 Mendy Lee – backing vocals (7)
 Sue Sheridan – backing vocals (7)

Production 

 Michael Jay – producer 
 Michael McDonald – engineer, mixing (1-4, 6, 9, 10)
 Peter Arata – assistant engineer 
 Ric Butz – assistant engineer 
 John Hegedes – assistant engineer 
 Greg Loskorn – assistant engineer 
 Karen Siegel – assistant engineer 
 Russ Iadevaia – lead vocal recording (2)
 Keith "KC" Cohen – mixing (5, 8)
 Brian Malouf – mixing (7)
 Garden Rake Studios (Sherman Oaks, California) – mixing location 
 Larrabee Sound Studios (North Hollywood, California) – mixing location 
 Stephen Marcussen – mastering at Precision Lacquer (Hollywood, California)
 Nancy Donald – art direction 
 Tony Lane – art direction 
 Arnold Levine – art direction 
 David Coleman – design 
 Alberto Tolot – photography

Chart performance

Weekly charts

Year-end charts

Sales and certifications

References

1988 debut albums
Martika albums
CBS Records albums
Columbia Records albums
Spanish-language albums